Carlos Lopez IV (June 26, 1989 – October 2, 2014) was an American stunt performer.

Biography 
Born in North Carolina, Lopez's credits included The Hunger Games: Catching Fire, Teenage Mutant Ninja Turtles, 22 Jump Street and Olympus Has Fallen, as well as the TV series The Vampire Diaries and Banshee. He also played Henry in the 2006 martial arts comedy film, The Foot Fist Way.

Lopez held a second degree black belt in karate, and was a member of North Carolina's Stuntman Association. While on vacation in Portugal on October 2, 2014, Lopez accidentally fell from a balcony, resulting in his death.

References

External links 

1989 births
2014 deaths
American stunt performers
Accidental deaths in Portugal
People from North Carolina